Jeremy Gilchrist (born February 24, 1986 in Norfolk, Virginia) is a professional American and Canadian football wide receiver who is currently a free agent. He played college football for the Hampton Pirates.

1986 births
Living people
American football wide receivers
American players of Canadian football
Canadian football wide receivers
Hampton Pirates football players
Players of Canadian football from Norfolk, Virginia
Players of American football from Norfolk, Virginia